Kim Un-ju (born 11 November 1989) is a North Korean weightlifter, and former world record holder competing in the 75 kg category until 2018 and 87 kg starting in 2018 after the International Weightlifting Federation reorganized the categories.

Career
In 2014 she was sanctioned for the use of Methyltestosterone and was banned from competition until 2016, thus disqualifying her results from the 2014 World Weightlifting Championships.

Kim competed at the 2018 World Weightlifting Championships winning a silver medal in the total.

Major results

References

External links
 
 

1989 births
Living people
World Weightlifting Championships medalists
North Korean female weightlifters
Weightlifters at the 2010 Asian Games
Weightlifters at the 2014 Asian Games
Asian Games medalists in weightlifting
World record holders in Olympic weightlifting
Asian Games gold medalists for North Korea
Medalists at the 2014 Asian Games